Edward Wheller (23 May 1896 – 14 December 1968) was a British hurdler. He competed in the men's 400 metres hurdles at the 1920 Summer Olympics.

References

1896 births
1968 deaths
Athletes (track and field) at the 1920 Summer Olympics
British male hurdlers
Olympic athletes of Great Britain
Place of birth missing